Bulgarian National Film Archive also known as Bulgarian Cinematheque is an organization formed to acquire, restore, preserve and store film and film related archival artefacts of the national and world culture. Since 1959 it is a Member of the International Federation of Film Archives.

The head office of the Cinematheque is accommodated in an old Art Deco-style house located in the Sofia city center. The very archive is currently stored in several cities – Sofia, Stara Zagora and Belogradchik.
The main base where the film collection is held is located just nearby the Boyana Film Centre (Sofia suburb).

As a structure the institution is consist of Direction; Sector Administrative; Sector Film Collection; Sector Information, Repertoire and Programming and a small cinema hall named Odeon.

The logo of the Bulgarian National Film Archive was designed by Stefan Kanchev, the "father of Bulgarian graphic design".

History
Since the year of the making of the first Bulgarian feature film Bulgaran is Gallant is disputable
the exact date of foundation of the Film Archive also varies in the memories of the people who worked there. Howsoever it corresponds with the period when the first national film archives were established. For instance, it is reported that the first film archives are found during 1935 in London and New York City followed by the French one in 1936.

When the communist regime took the rule in the country, the Bulgarian film-making was nationalized.  Subsequently, in 1948 a National Film Museum was founded. Its beginnings were laid again by the pioneer of Bulgarian cinema Vasil Gendov. He collected the film-copies of the distribution net as well as of the nationalized distributors and also found and restored posters, photos and materials about our film-making history. The collection started with 154 newsreels, 117 short films, most of them shot by foreign cameramen, 15 Bulgarian feature films, 500 foreign feature films and about 550 Bulgarian documentaries and popular science films.
The first official documents manifested the foundation of the Film Archive in 1952 as a part of the nationalized Bulgarian cinematography. The General department of archives in Bulgaria methodically guided the work of the Film Archive in those years.

In 1994, after the liberation, by Ordinance issued by the Council of Ministers is determined the status of the Bulgarian National Film Archive as cultural institution of national significance. Its range is directly under the Ministry of Culture.

The Cinema Hall

Since it is typical for the film archive institutions to have in their structure small cinemas that screens particularly classic and art-house films, the Bulgarian one has a cinema hall too. It is named "Odeon" and located in Sofia city center too, not far from the head office house.

Initially the cinema was opened in 1961 in the hall of the Arts and Culture Club at 108 Rakovski st. After some break the Film Archive rented Vlaikova Cinema hall in 1969 with consideration to convert it into specialized cinematheque cinema. Soon the screenings in this hall were ceased too, only to be continued at the newly opened Vitosha cinema. A year later the Film Archive got its own hall named Druzhba cinema. In 1991,  after the falling of the communist regime it was renamed "Odeon cinematheque cinema". Being a specialized cinema it organizes its program in cycles, arranges special weeks, foreign film reviews, celebrations of local and international artists.

The hall is housed on the ground floor in a seven-storeyed corner building. It is situated by one of the Sofia landmarks - the Patriarch Evtimiy Square with the monument of Evtimiy of Tarnovo, Patriarch of Bulgaria. The place is also a popular meeting point for the residents of the city.

Collection

The Bulgarian Cinematheque holds the national film archive, which consists of 15 000
titles with more than 40 000 copies or 300 000 film reels.

Film Holdings
There are 9 528 Bulgarian films:
 - 5 844 documentaries and popular science films
 - 2 364 newsreels
 - 700 feature films
 - 620 animations, newsreels, chronicles and periodicals

The foreign collection includes 4 348 items from 54 countries:
 - 3 589 feature films
 - 625 documentaries
 - 134 animations

The collection is enlarged and enriched mainly with the films, made by the studios around the country, international exchange or donations.

The Archive also holds more than 3000 videotapes.

Other Holdings
The Bulgarian Film Archive holds a large related non-film collection, consisting of:
 - 10 000 volumes of books and magazines
 - 27 000 unique posters
 - 118 000 photos
 - 15 600 dialogue lists
 - more than 600 records of Bulgarian feature films

Notes

References
Official site

External links
FIAF

Film archives in Europe
Buildings and structures in Sofia
Bulgarian culture
Film organizations in Bulgaria
Art Deco architecture
FIAF-affiliated institutions